The women's individual recurve competition in archery at the 2021 Islamic Solidarity Games will held from 15 to 18 August at the Saraçoğlu Sport Complex  in Konya.

Qualification round
Results after 72 arrows.

Finals

Elimination round
Source:

Section 1

Section 2

Section 3

Section 4

References

Women's individual recurve